Pan Am Flight 806 was an international scheduled flight from Auckland, New Zealand, to Los Angeles, California, with intermediate stops at Pago Pago, American Samoa and Honolulu, Hawaii. On January 30, 1974, the Boeing 707 Clipper Radiant crashed on approach to Pago Pago International Airport, killing 87 passengers and ten crew members.

The National Transportation Safety Board (NTSB) determined the probable cause of the accident was the flight crew's tardy identification of microburst-induced wind shear. Other factors included poor visibility and a lack of altitude and airspeed callouts by the aircrew.

Aircraft and flight crew
The aircraft involved was a Boeing 707-321B powered by Pratt & Whitney JT3D-3B engines. Registered N454PA with manufacturer's serial number 19376/661, it had accumulated 21,625 airframe hours since its first flight in 1967. It was piloted by Captain Leroy Petersen, 52, who had 17,414 hours of pilot time of which 7,416 hours were in the 707. The copilot was First Officer Richard Gaines, 37, with 5,107 total piloting hours all in the 707. The Third officer was James Phillips, 43, with 5,208 total pilot hours of which 4,706 were on the 707 and the flight engineer was Gerry Green, 37, who had 2,399 total hours as both a Flight Engineer and reserve first officer of which 1,444 were on the 707.

Although Gaines was scheduled to act as First officer on the flight, he had become ill with Laryngitis and as such was replaced by Third Officer Phillips, who acted as First Officer whilst Gaines stayed in the cockpit in the jumpseat.

Accident
At 20:14 Flight 806 departed Auckland with 91 passengers
and 10 crewmembers on board with an instrument flight rules (IFR) flight plan to  Pago Pago.

Pago Pago Approach Control reported winds zero one zero degrees at one five gusting two zero.

The flight was receiving signals from the Localizer and was using the Instrument landing system (ILS) for runway 5. At 23:38 the approach controller informed the flight of a bad rain shower at the airport, then at 23:39 stated the wind is zero three zero degrees at two zero, gusting two five. The flight transmitted "Eight zero six, wilco" at 23:39:41. This was the last communication received from Flight 806.

The Cockpit voice recorder (CVR) recorded normal cockpit conversation during the last minute of the flight. At 23:40:22 the co-pilot reported "You're a little high" and at 23:40:33 "You're at minimums." At 23:40:35 the first officer stated "Field in sight" then "Turn to your right" followed by "hundred and forty knots." No further conversation was recorded by the CVR.

At 23:40:42 the 707 came in contact with trees  short of the runway 5 threshold. The aircraft first impacted the ground 236 feet further and plowed through dense vegetation for another  before crashing into a three foot high rock wall. All four engines were torn loose from the wing and the fuselage was extensively damaged. A post-impact fire consumed most of the aircraft.

Aftermath
The crew of 10 and 87 passengers ultimately died as a direct cause of the accident. Notably, all the passengers and crew survived the initial impact. Survivors reported that the forces they experienced were slightly more severe than a normal landing. After examination the cabin interior was found to be undamaged by the crash.

Nine passengers and one crew member, Third Officer Phillips, survived the initial crash and post-accident fire. One passenger died the day after the accident. Three days after the accident, the remaining crew member and three passengers died. One passenger died nine days after the accident. According to NTSB 49 CFR part 830, fatalities occurring more than seven days after the accident shall not be attributed to said accident.

Investigation
The NTSB's final report dated October 6, 1977 determined that the probable cause of the accident was:

See also

Pan Am Flight 759, another Pan Am plane that encountered a microburst induced wind-shear and crashed
Delta Air Lines Flight 191
USAir Flight 1016
Aeromexico Connect Flight 2431

References

Airliner accidents and incidents in American Samoa
Aviation accidents and incidents in American Samoa
Aviation accidents and incidents in 1974
806
Accidents and incidents involving the Boeing 707
Airliner accidents and incidents caused by pilot error
Airliner accidents and incidents caused by microbursts
1974 meteorology
1974 in American Samoa
Aviation accidents and incidents in the United States in 1974
January 1974 events in Oceania